The 2019 Letran Knights men's basketball team represented Colegio de San Juan de Letran in the 95th season of the National Collegiate Athletic Association in the Philippines. The men's basketball tournament for the school year 2019-20 began on July 7, 2019, and the host school for the season was Arellano University.

The Knights finished the double round-robin eliminations at third place with 12 wins against 6 losses. They then eliminated San Sebastian Stags in the first round of the stepladder semifinals and went on to defeat the second seeded Lyceum Pirates in the next round to advance to the finals against the undefeated San Beda Red Lions.

The Knights went on to defeat the Red Lions in three games to capture their 18th NCAA championship, their first since winning the title last 2015 when they also toppled San Beda in the finals. Point guard Fran Yu was named Finals Most Valuable Player and Most Improved Player of the season.

Roster 

 Depth chart Depth chart

Coaching staff 
Head coach Jeff Napa formally part ways with Letran at the end of his three-year contract, who was then hired in the Philippine Basketball Association by NorthPort Batang Pier as an assistant coach. On February 28, 2019, Letran officials formally named NorthPort Batang Pier team manager and former longtime Lyceum Pirates head coach Bonnie Tan as the Knights' new mentor.

Joining Tan in the coaching staff are Raymund Tiongco, Eiven Gatumbato, Gil Lumberio, Letran Squires head coach RJ Guevarra, Diliman College Blue Dragons head coach Rensy Bajar, and PBA star LA Tenorio.

Pre-season results 
2019 Filoil Flying V Preseason Premier Cup

2019 PBA D-League Aspirants Cup

NCAA Season 95 games results 

Elimination games were played in a double round-robin format. All games were aired on ABS-CBN Sports and Action, Liga, & iWantTFC.

Source: Pong Ducanes, Imperium Technology

Awards

References 

2019–20 in Philippine college basketball
Letran Knights basketball team seasons